Hubert Hahne (28 March 1935 – 24 April 2019) was a racing driver from Germany. He was the older brother of Armin Hahne, as well as the uncle of Jörg van Ommen.

Career
He participated in five Formula One World Championship Grands Prix, two of those at the wheel of Formula Two cars, and one non-Championship Formula One race.

Hahne was successful in touring car racing, including the European Touring Car Championship. In 1966, he raced a BMW New Class 2000TI. In the six-hour "Großer Preis der Tourenwagen" on 3 July 1966, an Alfa Romeo GTA had lowered the Nürburgring touring car race lap record to 10:08.9. A month later, in a support race for the 1966 German Grand Prix, Hahne was the first to lap the Nürburgring in under 10 minutes in a touring car, in 9:58.5.

 
On the old and very long Nürburgring, Formula Two cars occasionally had their own race alongside the Formula One cars in the same events to fill the field, which provided other drivers like Kurt Ahrens Jr., Gerhard Mitter and Dieter Quester the opportunity to enter the German Grand Prix. As the Formula Two section was counted separately, the drivers could not score World Championship points. Hahne participated in the 1966 and 1969 German Grands Prix in the special Formula Two sections of those events, but withdrew before the start of the 1969 event due to the fatal accident suffered by his team-mate Gerhard Mitter.

For his true Formula One debut at the 1967 German Grand Prix, Hahne drove a Formula Two Lola chassis fitted with a 2-litre 16 valve BMW engine, thus qualifying the drive for Formula One. The BMW factory were allowed to run this to give some national encouragement. He retired on lap 7 with suspension failure. The following year he finished 10th in the same car.

Hahne got himself a March 701 for 1970, but could not qualify for the 1970 German Grand Prix which was held at the Hockenheimring that year. Hahne claimed that chassis and engine were among the worst of the many March and Cosworth delivered that year. Ronnie Peterson showed later at Silverstone that this very car could reach adequate times, and Hahne retired from racing.

Racing record

Complete Formula One World Championship results
(key)

Complete European Formula Two Championship results
(key)

Complete British Saloon Car Championship results
(key) (Races in bold indicate pole position; races in italics indicate fastest lap.)

References

External links

 https://web.archive.org/web/20060522051555/http://bmw-motorsport.com/ms/en/fascination/history/bmw_touring/heroes/index.html
 https://web.archive.org/web/20060220041357/http://www.autocoursegpa.com/driver~driver_id~11791.htm
 https://web.archive.org/web/20060627021546/http://www.john-w.de/bmwf2/

1935 births
2019 deaths
German racing drivers
German Formula One drivers
People from Moers
Sportspeople from Düsseldorf (region)
European Formula Two Championship drivers
Lamborghini people
Racing drivers from North Rhine-Westphalia
BMW (1950s–60s) Formula One drivers
Tyrrell Formula One drivers
European Touring Car Championship drivers
24 Hours of Spa drivers